Kenneth Page Oakley (7 April 1911 – 2 November 1981) was an English physical anthropologist, palaeontologist and geologist.

Oakley, known for his work in the Fluorine absorption dating of fossils by fluorine content, was instrumental in the exposure of the Piltdown Man hoax in the 1950s.

Oakley was born and died in Amersham, Buckinghamshire.

Education 
Oakley's early education took place at the Grammar School at Amersham. As a young man he attended University College School, Hampstead, and then University College School, London. The latter is where he earned both his BSc as a major in anthropology and geology, and his PhD in the same field upon his completion of the program in 1938 when he was 27 years old.

Career

Publications
Kenneth Oakley authored and contributed to several publications that developed the field of human evolution over the course of his life. One of these publications is the novel Man the Tool-Maker (1972) in which he thoroughly outlines the discoveries of pre-hominin and hominin tool use. Oakley does so by walking the reader through the historical background of about the previous conceptions of evolution, why tool use may have started, various tool compositions and purposes as discovered through fossils, and how tool use may have influenced the development of unique cultures. Oakley also includes several illustrations ranging from diagrams of how tools may have been used and actual images of fossilized tools as they have changed over time. Man the Tool-Maker has been republished several times since its initial publication in 1949 for a total of six separate editions by 1976.

Another source that Oakley contributed to is the Catalogue of Fossil Hominids Part III: Americas, Asia, Australasia which he, Bernard Grant Campbell, and Theya Ivitsky Molleson all edited. This catalog, including Part I: Africa and Part II: Europe, organized all the identifying information of the hominids that had been discovered until that time in the late 1960s and early 1970s, including where they were discovered, the key features of the specimen, and their archeological contexts. Oakley was tasked with providing confirmation of the geological and absolute ages of the specimens, since that was considered his speciality.

Other Publications Contributed to by Oakley 

Piltdown man, Bobbs-Merrill, 1955
The succession of life through geological time, British Museum, 1967
Frameworks for dating fossil man, Weidenfeld & Nicolson; 3rd ed, 1969
Catalogue of Fossil Hominids: Africa, British Museum, 1977
Relative dating of the fossil hominids of Europe, British Museum, 1980

Exposure of Piltdown Man Hoax 
In November 1953 Oakley, along with Drs. J. S. Weiner and W. E. le Gros Clark published The Solution of the Piltdown Problem in the Bulletin of The British Museum of Natural History: Geology Department. This publication provided the discovered evidence that proved the "Piltdown Man", a skull that was initially deemed a new species and potential "missing link" called Eoanthropus dawsoni that had been discovered in 1913 by archeologist Charles Dawson, was in fact a hoax. Through a complete re-analysis of the specimen's teeth abrasion, fluorine content, nitrogen content, and coloring, Oakley and his colleagues concluded that the skull fragments were not of one specimen. Instead, it appeared that the skull was a fabrication produced out of a modern ape mandible that had been skillfully fused to the cranial fragments of another species.

This discovery by Oakley and his colleagues resulted in a vital reconstruction of the existing fossil record such that Eoanthropus dawsoni was removed, and proper research for other evidence of human evolution in other parts of the world could be encouraged.

References

1911 births
1981 deaths
People from Amersham
Physical anthropologists
British paleoanthropologists
People educated at Dr Challoner's Grammar School
20th-century English writers